Copperwheat is a surname of English origin. Notable people with the surname include:
 C. M. Copperwheat (active from 2010), astronomer
 Ben Copperwheat British print designer/artist living and working in New York City
 David Copperwheat (active from 2007), member of alt-country/indie band Tinker Jack from Bedford, England
 Dennis Copperwheat (191492), British Navy sailor who won the George Cross for heroism displayed during the defence of Malta in 1942
 Hallie Copperwheat (active from 2015), English artistic gymnast; see 2015 in artistic gymnastics
 Mark Copperwheat, English curler who took part in the 1998 World Junior Curling Championships and the 1999 European Curling Championships
 Winifred Copperwheat (190576), English viola player and teacher

See also 
 Copperwheat, a seasonal beer produced (in June) by Harveys Brewery, East Sussex, England
 Copperwheat Blundell, fashion designer